Vladlena Eduardovna Bobrovnikova (born 24 October 1987) is a Russian handball player for Rostov-Don and the Russian national team. She is a 2016 Olympic gold medalist.

Individual awards
 All-Star Left Back of the European Championship: 2020

References

External links

1987 births
Living people
Russian female handball players
Sportspeople from Krasnodar
Olympic medalists in handball
Olympic handball players of Russia
Olympic gold medalists for Russia
Medalists at the 2016 Summer Olympics
Medalists at the 2020 Summer Olympics
Handball players at the 2016 Summer Olympics
Handball players at the 2020 Summer Olympics
Russian expatriate sportspeople in Italy
Russian expatriate sportspeople in Serbia
Expatriate handball players
Olympic silver medalists for the Russian Olympic Committee athletes